Taquile is an island on the Peruvian side of Lake Titicaca 45 km offshore from the city of Puno. The inhabitants, known as Taquileños, speak Puno Quechua.

In 2005, "Taquile and Its Textile Art" were honored by being proclaimed "Masterpieces of the Oral and Intangible Heritage of Humanity" by UNESCO.

Textiles 
Taquileños are known for their fine handwoven textiles and clothing, which are regarded as among the highest-quality handicrafts in Peru. Knitting is exclusively performed by males, beginning in early boyhood. Women spin wool and use vegetables and minerals to dye the wool to be used by the community. Women are also the weavers of the Chumpis, the wide belts with woven designs worn by everyone in the community of Taquile.

Tourism 

Taquileans are known for having created an innovative, community-controlled sustainable tourism model, offering home stays, transportation, lodging for groups, cultural activities, local guides and restaurants. Ever since tourism started coming to Taquile in the 1970s, the Taquileans slowly lost control over the mass day-tourism operated by non-Taquileans. Taquile community have their own Travel Agency Munay Taquile  has been established to regain local control over tourism.

Society and economy 
Taquileños run their society based on community collectivism and on the Inca moral code ama sua, ama llulla, ama qhilla, (Quechua for "do not steal, do not lie, do not be lazy"). The island is divided into six sectors or suyus for crop rotation purposes. The economy is based on fishing, terraced farming horticulture based on potato cultivation and tourist-generated income from the approximately 40,000 tourists who visit each year. Taquile's families own rams, sheep, cows, chickens and sometimes guinea pigs.

Cuisine 
Taquile offers a wide range of typical dishes. Breakfast consists of two pancakes with sugar or bread with eggs, with a cup of tea made from either Muña or Coca. For lunch, dishes are a vegetable soup, fish with rice and a tomato and onion salad. For dinner, the Taquilean people serve vegetable soup with bread.

Religion 
The majority of the inhabitants of Taquile are Catholic. They adapted this religion, harmonizing Andean religion with the syncretic Christian culture. The mother earth (Pachamama), the principal Andean deity, directly controls harvesting and fertility; the island is home to four Apus, Andean mountaintop deities. People make several offerings to these deities each year, and they offer three coca leaves prior to each activity or trip. God is present throughout the year in the festivities. The two Catholic churches are in Centre and Huayllano; a Seventh-day Adventist church is located in Huayrapata.

Infrastructure 
Taquile has a radio station and is equipped with generators. Islanders have elected to use solar panels to generate energy.

Flora 
Flowers and trees on the Island include Kolle, the tree used to roof the houses and for firewood, the Cantuta flower (the national flower of Peru), the Chukjo (used as detergent) and Muña, used as natural medicines. Coca leaves are not cultivated in Taquile.

Gallery

See also
 Iperu, tourist information and assistance
 Tourism in Peru

Bibliography
 Kusikiy A Child from Taquile, Peru, 2010 
 Elayne Zorn, 2004. Weaving a Future: Tourism, Cloth and Culture on an Andean Island, Iowa City: University of Iowa Press.

External links

 Munay Taquile, travel agency owned by the people of Taquile Island.
  

Lake islands of Peru
Islands of Lake Titicaca
Landforms of Puno Region
Masterpieces of the Oral and Intangible Heritage of Humanity